The 2011–12 Football League One (referred to as the Npower Football League One for sponsorship reasons) was the eighth season of the league under its current title and nineteenth season under its current league division format.

Team changes

From League One
Promoted to the Championship
 Brighton & Hove Albion
 Southampton
 Peterborough United
Relegated to League Two
 Dagenham & Redbridge
 Bristol Rovers
 Plymouth Argyle
 Swindon Town

To League One
Relegated from the Championship
 Sheffield United
 Scunthorpe United
 Preston North End
Promoted from League Two
 Chesterfield
 Bury
 Wycombe Wanderers
 Stevenage

Rules changes
 The Football League agreed to use the new UEFA financial regulations. Football League One clubs decided to introduce the Salary Cost Management Protocol (SCMP) from this season, teams will only be allowed to spend a fixed proportion of their total turnover on player wages.

Team overview

Stadia and locations

Personnel and sponsoring

Managerial changes

League table

Play-offs

Results
The fixtures for the League One were released on 17 June 2011. The season kick-off was announced for 6 August 2011, and concluded on 5 May 2012.

Statistics

Top goalscorers

Top assists

Scoring
First goal of the season: Anthony Wordsworth for Colchester United against Preston North End (6 August 2011)
Highest scoring game: 8 goals – Milton Keynes Dons 6–2 Chesterfield (20 August 2011), Sheffield Wednesday 4–4 Huddersfield Town (17 December 2011)Sheffield United 4–4 Exeter City (29 October 2011)
Most goals scored in a game by one team: 6 goals – Milton Keynes Dons 6–2 Chesterfield (20 August 2011), Colchester United 1–6 Stevenage (26 December 2011), Wycombe Wanderers 0–6 Huddersfield Town (6 January 2012, Yeovil Town 0–6 Stevenage (14 April 2012))
Widest winning margin: 6 goals – Wycombe Wanderers 0–6 Huddersfield Town (6 January 2012, Yeovil Town 0–6 Stevenage (14 April 2012))
Most goals scored by a player in a game: 5 goals Jordan Rhodes - Wycombe Wanderers 0–6 Huddersfield Town (6 January 2012)
Fewest games failed to score in:
Most games failed to score in:

Awards

Monthly awards

Other awards

References

 
EFL League One seasons
2011–12 Football League
3
Eng

hu:2010–2011-es angol labdarúgó-bajnokság (másodosztály)